Mohammad Shahjahan may refer to:

 Mohammad Shahjahan (CEO), CEO of Grameen Bank
 Mohammad Shahjahan (footballer) (born 2000), Indian footballer
 M Shahjahan, rear admiral of Bangladesh Navy

See also
 Muhammad Shahjahan (1939–2000), Bangladeshi academic